Shirley Bousquet (born 5 March 1976) is a French actress.

Life and career
From 1998 to 2004, Shirley Bousquet played the recurring role of Jeanne Bouvier in the television series Sous le soleil.
In 2001, she was revealed to the public on television with her character Nancy Langeais in the series Camera Café. In 2005, she takes the character of Nancy in the film adaptation of the series Camera Café, in Espace détente.

In 2012, she plays in "L'amour c'est mieux à deux" of Dominique Farrugia and Arnaud Lemort where she is the enterprising and offbeat secretary of Clovis Cornillac.
In 2012, she plays in "Plan de table" of Christelle Raynal where she plays the role of Edith, one of the main characters of the film.

In 2015, she is the mistress of ceremony at the opening of the 17th edition of the La Rochelle Festival

In 2016, she participated in the spot "Safety for all" by Frédéric Chau. This video shows personalities, like Josiane Balasko, Édouard Montoute, Michel Boujenah, and anonymous people from all backgrounds expressing their turn face camera by proclaiming strong sentences like "Prejudices kill", "Silence, we kill" or "Where is the freedom if going out kills us?". The same year, she participated with several artists in the clip "Seul Ensemble" for the benefit of the parents' home of the Margency pediatric hospital.

Filmography

Feature films

Television

References

External links

 

1976 births
Living people
French film actresses
French television actresses
21st-century French actresses